Yevhen Mykhailovych Konovalets ( Коновалець; June 14, 1891 – May 23, 1938), also anglicized as Eugene Konovalets, was a military commander of the Ukrainian National Republic army, veteran of the Ukrainian-Soviet War and political leader of the Ukrainian nationalist movement. He is best known as the leader of the Organization of Ukrainian Nationalists from its foundation in 1929 until his assassination in 1938.

Biography
Konovalets was born June 14, 1891 in the village of Zashkiv in the Austro-Hungarian Galicia; today it is in Lviv Raion, Lviv Oblast, Ukraine. In his youth he studied in Lviv at the Lviv Academic Gymnasium and in 1909 enrolled in the University of Lviv, where he studied mathematics. In 1910 he participated in the protest to accommodate Ukrainians with their own university in Lviv. During this protest at least one person was killed. He became an active member of the Prosvita, the Ukrainian educational association, and a representative in the Executive Committee of the National-Democratic Party. He became the secretary of the Lviv department of the Prosvita organization in 1912. In 1913 he became one of the leaders of the local student movement. He was greatly influenced by the nationalist ideology and rhetoric of such prominent Ukrainians as Ivan Bobersky, Myroslav Sichynsky, Dmytro Dontsov, and others.

Military career
In the summer of 1914, Konovalets was mobilized into the Austro-Hungarian Army and during the First World War rose to the rank of a second lieutenant serving in the 19th Regiment of the Lviv Regional Defense. In 1915 he was taken prisoner of war by the Russians during the battles near the mountain Makivka (Carpathian Mountains) and interned in a POW camp near Tsaritsyn, Chornyi Yar.  In 1916 he was transferred into the concentration camp near Dubovka.  While in captivity he joined a group of former Galician officers (such as Andriy Melnyk, Roman Sushko, and Fed Chernyk among others) who fled to Kyiv together.  In November 1917, together with the Galician-Bucovina Committee, he organized the Halytsko-Bukovynsky Kurin of the Sich Riflemen as part of the Doroshenko Regiment. Two months later he assumed its command and helped suppress the Communist uprising in Kyiv as well as resisting the Antonov-Ovseenko offensive. In March 1918 his riflemen, together with the Zaporizhia Corps of the Ukrainian People's Republic and the reformed Haydamaky Kish of the Sloboda Ukraine, liberated Kyiv from the Soviets. In May 1918 his military unit was disbanded due to its political views.

Political career
In the summer of 1918 he convinced Pavlo Skoropadskyi, Hetman of Ukraine, to create a  Special Platoon of Sich Riflemen, which was established in Bila Tserkva.

According to Peter Kenez, "On December 14, after the Directorate arrived at an agreement with the Germans, who were anxious to complete their evacuation and therefore promised neutrality, the Army of the Directorate under General Konovalets entered the Ukrainian capital and met only sporadic resistance. Fifteen hundred Russian officers were sequestered in the Pedagogical Museum; their weapons were taken away and they were regarded as prisoners of war."

On December 6, 1919, by the Order of the Head Otaman he demobilized his military formations. The same year he was taken prisoner and interned in a Polish POW camp in Lutsk, although he was released in the spring of 1920 and moved to Czechoslovakia. In 1920, as a result of the shattered struggle for Ukrainian independence, Konovalets set up a new organization capable of clandestine activities on the lands claimed by Ukrainians and controlled by Poland, Russian SFSR, Romania, and Czechoslovakia. Created in August of that year in Prague, the Ukrainian Military Organization (UVO) was aimed at armed resistance against Poland and Russia and was involved in the military training of youth and the prevention of any form of cooperation between Ukrainian and Polish authorities. The organization often resorted to terrorist attacks against Polish politicians as well as members of Ukrainian intelligentsia striving for cooperation with Poles (assassination of Sydir Tverdokhlib and Sofron Matviyas). The name of the organization was inspired by Piłsudski's Polish Military Organisation , which operated during the World War I. The foundation of the organization became the leaders of the Ukrainian Halych Army. After the end of the Polish–Soviet War and the battle for Lviv, Konovalets became the leader of the UVO in the city. However, after several acts of sabotage his organisation was broken by the police, and in December 1922 Konovalets fled the country.

Exile and assassination
During his exile years he lived in Czechoslovakia, Germany, Switzerland and Italy. In 1929 he took part in the first congress of Ukrainian nationalists in Vienna. During the congress it was decided to form the Organization of Ukrainian Nationalists (OUN), and Konovalets was elected as its leader. He then actively promoted its influence among the Ukrainian emigres throughout Europe and America while establishing contacts with intelligence offices of Lithuania, Germany, Italy, Great Britain, and others. With his direct help were formed the Societies of Sich Riflemen in North America. The goal of the OUN was to revive an independent Ukraine through armed struggle.

Konovalets' activities raised fears in the Kremlin because of penetration of the OUN into the Soviet Union. On May 23, 1938, he was assassinated in Rotterdam by a bomb rigged to explode hidden inside a box of chocolates. This booby-trap was disguised as a present from a close friend. This friend, however, was in reality an NKVD agent who had infiltrated the Organization of Ukrainian Nationalists. Pavel Sudoplatov, who on a recent visit to the Soviet Union had been personally ordered by Joseph Stalin to assassinate Konovalets in retaliation for the assassination of a Soviet diplomat at the consulate in Lviv in 1933. Pavel Sudoplatov had beforehand slipped into Finland in July 1935 using the alias 'Pavel Gridgdenko' after a period of training. According to Sudoplatov, Stalin had told him, "This is not just an act of revenge, although Konovalets is an agent of German fascism. Our goal is to behead the movement of Ukrainian fascism on the eve of the war and force these gangsters to annihilate each other in a struggle for power."

Legacy

Due to his sudden disappearance, the OUN immediately suspected Sudoplatov of Konovalets' murder. Therefore, a photograph of Sudoplatov and Konovalets together was distributed to every OUN unit. According to Sudoplatov, In the 1940s, SMERSH... captured two guerilla fighters in Western Ukraine, one of whom had this photo of me on him. When asked why he was carrying it, he replied, "I have no idea why, but the order is if we find this man to liquidate him."

Commemoration
In 2006, the Lviv city administration announced the future transference of the remains of Yevhen Konovalets, Stepan Bandera, Andriy Melnyk and other key leaders of OUN and UPA to a new area of Lychakiv Cemetery specifically dedicated to heroes of the Ukrainian liberation movement.

On June 17, 2011 in Vilnius, Lithuania the conference "Yevhen Konovalets: Lithuanian citizen - the Ukrainian patriot. Celebration of 120th birthday" was organised by the Lithuanian Parliamentary Foreign Affairs Committee, People's Liberation Movement Research Centre (Ukraine) and Ukrainian organizations in Lithuania.

References 

 Volodymyr Kubijovyč, Encyclopedia of Ukraine, Toronto: University of Toronto Press 1984 - 2001.
 encyclopediaofukraine.com
 Dovidnyk z istorii Ukrainy, Kyiv: Heneza 2002.
 Vladislav Moulis, Běsové ruské revoluce, Praha: Dokořán, 2002.
 Foreign Affairs

External links

  Audiobook Symon Petliura, Yevhen Konovalets, Stepan Bandera -  Three Leaders of Ukrainian Liberation Movement murdered by the Order of  Moscow
 

1891 births
1938 deaths
People from Lviv Oblast
People from the Kingdom of Galicia and Lodomeria
Ukrainian Austro-Hungarians
Organization of Ukrainian Nationalists politicians
Ukrainian anti-communists
Ukrainian politicians before 1991
Ukrainian people of World War I
Austro-Hungarian military personnel of World War I
Ukrainian people of the Polish–Ukrainian War
University of Lviv alumni
Assassinated Ukrainian politicians
Extrajudicial killings
Ukrainian people murdered abroad
Assassinations in the Netherlands
Ukrainian nationalists
Burials at Lychakiv Cemetery
People killed in NKVD operations
Deaths by improvised explosive device